Chevy Chase is the name of both a town and an unincorporated census-designated place (Chevy Chase (CDP), Maryland) that straddle the northwest border of Washington, D.C. and Montgomery County, Maryland, United States. Several settlements in the same area of Montgomery County and one neighborhood of Washington include Chevy Chase in their names. These villages, the town, and the CDP share a common history and together form a larger community colloquially referred to as Chevy Chase.

Primarily a residential suburb, Chevy Chase adjoins Friendship Heights, a popular shopping district. It is the home of the Chevy Chase Club and Columbia Country Club, private clubs whose members include many prominent politicians and Washingtonians. 

Chevy Chase was noted as "the most educated town in America" in a study conducted by the Stanford Graduate School of Education, with 93.5 percent of adult residents having at least a bachelor's degree.

The name Chevy Chase is derived from Cheivy Chace, the name of the land patented to Colonel Joseph Belt from Charles Calvert, 5th Baron Baltimore, on July 10, 1725. It has historic associations with a 1388 chevauchée, a French word describing a border raid, fought by Lord Percy of England and Earl Douglas of Scotland over hunting grounds, or a "chace", in the Cheviot Hills of Northumberland and Otterburn. The battle was memorialized in "The Ballad of Chevy Chase".

History

19th century
In the 1880s, Senator Francis G. Newlands of Nevada and his partners began acquiring farmland in this unincorporated area of Maryland and just inside the District of Columbia, for the purpose of developing a residential streetcar suburb for Washington, D.C., during the expansion of the Washington streetcars system. Newlands and his partners founded The Chevy Chase Land Company in 1890, and its holdings of more than  eventually extended along the present-day Connecticut Avenue from Florida Avenue north to Jones Bridge Road. 

Newlands, an avowed white supremacist, and his development company took steps to ensure that residents of its new suburbs would be wealthy and white; for example, "requiring, in the deed to the land, that only a single-family detached house costing a large amount of money could be constructed. The Chevy Chase Land Company did not include explicit bars against non-white people, known as racial covenants, but the mandated cost of the house made it impractical for all but the wealthiest non-white people to buy the land." Houses were required to cost $5,000 and up on Connecticut Avenue and $3,000 and up on side streets. The company banned commerce from the residential neighborhoods.  

Leon E. Dessez was Chevy Chase's first resident. He and Lindley Johnson of Philadelphia designed the first four houses in the area.

Toward the northern end of its holdings, the Land Company formed a manmade lake, called Chevy Chase Lake, to produce hydroelectric power for its streetcars, and provide a venue for boating, swimming, and other activities. The streetcar soon became vital to the community; it connected workers to the city, and even ran errands for residents. 

Part of the original Cheivy Chace patent had been sold to Abraham Bradley, who built an estate known as the Bradley Farm.  In 1892, Newlands and other members of the Metropolitan Club of Washington, D.C., founded a hunt club called Chevy Chase Hunt, which would later become Chevy Chase Club.  In 1894, the club located itself on the former Bradley Farm property under a lease from its owners.  The club introduced a six-hole golf course to its members in 1895, and purchased the 9.36-acre Bradley Farm tract in 1897.

20th century
In 1906, the Chevy Chase Land Company blocked a proposed subdivision called Belmont after they learned its Black developers aimed to sell house lots to other African Americans. In subsequent litigation, the company and its affiliates argued that those developers had committed fraud by proposing "to sell lots...to negroes."

By the 1920s, restrictive covenants were added to Chevy Chase real estate deeds. Some prohibited both the sale or rental of homes to "a Negro or one of the African race." Others prohibited sales or rentals to "any persons of the Semetic [sic] race", i.e. the exclusion of Jews. 

By World War II, such restrictive language had largely disappeared from real estate transactions, and all were voided by the 1948 Supreme Court decision in Shelley v. Kraemer.

Lea M. Bouligny founded the Chevy Chase College and Seminary for Young Ladies at the Chevy Chase Inn, located at 7100 Connecticut Avenue). The name was changed to Chevy Chase Junior College in 1927. The National 4-H Club Foundation purchased the property in 1951, turning it into the group's Youth Conference Center. For decades, the center hosted the National 4-H Conference, an event for 4-Hers throughout the nation to attend, and the annual National Science Bowl in late April or early May.

21st century 
The  National 4-H Club Foundation sold the center in 2021 for $40 million; as of 2022, it is to be replaced by a senior living development.

Subdivisions
 Census-designated place of Chevy Chase
 Incorporated town of Chevy Chase
 Chevy Chase (Washington, D.C.)

Villages
 Chevy Chase Village, Maryland
 Chevy Chase Section Three, Maryland
 Chevy Chase Section Five, Maryland
 Martin's Additions, Maryland
 North Chevy Chase, Maryland

In addition to the Maryland villages listed above, the United States Postal Service uses Chevy Chase for some postal addresses that lie outside historical Chevy Chase: in Somerset, the Village of Friendship Heights, and the Rock Creek Forest area, east of Jones Mill Road and Beach Drive and west of Grubb Road.

Education
Chevy Chase is served by the Montgomery County Public Schools. Residents of Chevy Chase are zoned to Somerset, Chevy Chase or North Chevy Chase Elementary School, which feed into Silver Creek Middle School, Westland Middle School and Bethesda-Chevy Chase High School. Private schools in Chevy Chase include Concord Hill School, Oneness-Family School, and Blessed Sacrament School.

Rochambeau French International School formerly had a campus in Chevy Chase.

Retail

Notable people

Current residents
 Ann Brashares - author
 Tony Kornheiser -  television host, currently ESPN employee presenter
 Brett Kavanaugh - associate justice, United States Supreme Court
 Marvin Kalb - journalist
 Chris Matthews - commentator
 Jerome Powell - current Chairman of the Federal Reserve
 John Roberts - Chief Justice of the United States
 Mark Shields - political columnist
 George Will - conservative commentator
A. B. Stoddard - political commentator and editor of RealClearPolitics
Howard Kurtz - host of Fox News program Media Buzz
 Collin Martin - soccer player

Former residents

 Yosef Alon
 Jamshid Amouzegar, former prime minister of Iran.
 Tom Braden - journalist and author
 David Brinkley - journalist
 John Charles Daly - radio and television personality
 Bill Guckeyson - athlete and military aviator
 Ed Henry - White House correspondent for Fox News
 Richard Helms - former director of the Central Intelligence Agency
 Genevieve Hughes - one of the 13 original Freedom Riders
 Hubert Humphrey - vice president of the United States under Lyndon Johnson
 Gayle King - co-anchor of CBS This Morning and an editor-at-large for O, The Oprah Magazine
 Ted Lerner - owner of Lerner Enterprises and the Washington Nationals
Anthony McAuliffe - US general known for his defense of Bastogne during World War II
 Sandra Day O'Connor - United States Supreme Court Justice; lived in Chevy Chase until 2005
 Hilary Rhoda - model
 Nancy Grace Roman - NASA's first female executive and, as Chief of Astronomy throughout the 1960s and 1970s, the founder of its space astronomy program and "Mother of Hubble".
 Peter Rosenberg - radio disc jockey, television host, and podcaster
 Danny Rubin - American-Israeli basketball player for Bnei Herzliya of the Israeli Basketball Premier League
 Karl Truesdell, U.S. Army major general

References

External links

 History of the Chevy Chase Land Company
 Chevy Chase Historical Society
 The Greater Bethesda-Chevy Chase Chamber of Commerce

 
1890 establishments in Maryland
Sundown towns in Maryland
Upper class culture in Maryland